In the early 1970s, the dancers on Don Cornelius' hit television program Soul Train were called the Soul Train Gang. But they became the Soul Train Dancers in 1975, when Cornelius and Dick Griffey co-founded Soul Train Records (later SOLAR Records), home to Lakeside, Shalamar, the Whispers and others—and decided to name an R&B vocal quintet The Soul Train Gang.

Consisting of two brothers' from Cincinnati, Ohio; Gerald Brown & Terry Brown; Judy Jones, Patricia Williamson (replaced by Denise Smith in 1976) and Hollis Pippin, the Soul Train Gang recorded its debut album, Don Cornelius Presents the Soul Train Gang, in 1975. Produced by Cornelius and Griffey, the LP included "Soul Train '75," one of the many themes from Soul Train. (The previous theme had previously been MFSB's famous "TSOP" on Philadelphia International.)

The group recorded its second album, The Soul Train Gang, produced by Norman Harris and done largely in Philadelphia, in 1976. Not surprisingly, Cornelius and Griffey hoped they could use Soul Train's popularity to make the Soul Train Gang a hit. But while both albums were decent examples of '70s soul and funk, neither made them a big name in the R&B world.

After the Gang disgrouped in 1977, Brown went on to join Shalamar the following year, replacing original member Gary Mumford. Brown appeared on Shalamar's second album, Shalamar Disco Gardens, and the hit single "Take That to the Bank" before being replaced by Howard Hewett in 1979.

American soul musical groups
American disco groups
American dance groups
Soul Train
Musical groups established in 1975
Musical groups disestablished in 1977